Alexis Taylor is an American agricultural policy advisor who is serving as under secretary of agriculture for trade and foreign agricultural affairs since December 2022. She formerly served as director of the Oregon Department of Agriculture from 2017 to 2022.

Early life and education 
Taylor was born and raised in Iowa. She earned a Bachelor of Arts degree in political science and government from Iowa State University.

Career 
Taylor served in the United States Army Reserve from 1998 to 2006. She was deployed to Iraq in 2003 and 2004. Taylor joined the office of Congressman Leonard Boswell as a legislative assistant. She later served as his legislative director. From 2010 to 2013, she served as a legislative assistant for Senator Max Baucus. Taylor then joined the United States Department of Agriculture, serving as chief of staff for Foreign Agricultural Service, deputy undersecretary of the Foreign Agricultural Service, and acting secretary of the Foreign Agricultural Service. In January 2017, she became director of the Oregon Department of Agriculture. She resigned effective September 30, 2022.

In May 2022, President Joe Biden nominated Taylor to be the under secretary of agriculture for trade and foreign agricultural affairs. Her nomination was confirmed by the United States Senate on December 21, 2022. She was sworn in on December 29, 2022.

References 

Living people
People from Iowa
Iowa State University alumni
United States Department of Agriculture officials
Obama administration personnel
Biden administration personnel
Year of birth missing (living people)